Abadi Creek is a stream located in the U.S. state of California. It is located in Santa Barbara County.

See also
List of rivers of California

References

Rivers of Southern California
Rivers of Santa Barbara County, California
Rivers of Ventura County, California